Almost all human deaths caused by rabies occur in Asia and Africa. There are an estimated 59,000 human deaths annually from rabies worldwide.

Dog licensing, euthanasia of stray dogs, muzzling, and other measures contributed to the elimination of rabies from the United Kingdom in the early 20th century. More recently, large-scale vaccination of cats, dogs and ferrets has been successful in combating rabies in many developed countries.

Rabies is a zoonotic disease, caused by the rabies virus. The rabies virus, a member of the Lyssavirus genus of the Rhabdoviridae family, survives in a diverse variety of animal species, including bats, monkeys, raccoons, foxes, skunks, wolves, coyotes, dogs, mongoose, weasels, cats, cattle, domestic farm animals, groundhogs,  bears, and wild carnivores. However, dogs are the principal host in Asia, parts of America, and large parts of Africa. Oral vaccines can be safely administered to wild animals through bait, a method initiated on a large scale in Belgium and that has successfully reduced rabies in rural areas of Canada, France, the United States, and elsewhere. For example, in Montreal baits are successfully ingested by raccoons in the Mount Royal park area.

Asia 
An estimated 31,000 human deaths due to rabies occur annually in Asia, with the majority – approximately 20,000 – concentrated in India. Worldwide, India has the highest rate of human rabies in the world primarily due to stray dogs. Because of a decline in the number of vultures due to acute poisoning by the anti-inflammatory drug diclofenac (vultures themselves are not susceptible to rabies), animal carcasses that would have been consumed by vultures instead became available for consumption by feral dogs, resulting in a growth of the dog population and thus a larger pool of carriers for the rabies virus. Another reason for the great increase in the number of stray dogs is the 2001 law that forbade the killing of dogs.

In many Asian countries which still have a high prevalence of rabies, such as Vietnam and Thailand, the virus is primarily transmitted through canines (feral dogs and other wild canine species).  Another source of rabies in Asia is the pet boom.

Mainland China 
Historically, rabies was highly endemic in China, with few/inconsistent attempts to control transmission due to the lack of healthcare infrastructure. More than 5,200 deaths were reported annually during the period 1987 - 1989. Infection is seasonal, with more cases reported during the spring and winter, with dogs being the most common animal vector. The highest number of recorded cases was recorded in 1981, with 7037 human infections. It wasn't until the 1990s that death rates decreased, as eradication efforts started being implemented on a nationwide level. The incidence of rabies decreased to fewer than 2000 cases per annum by 2011. Despite this progress, rabies is still the fourth most common cause of death amongst category A and B infectious diseases, following HIV/AIDS, tuberculosis and viral hepatitis in 2018.

Chinese law requires all diagnosed rabies cases to be recorded in the National Notifiable Disease Surveillance System (NNDSS) within 24 hours of diagnosis. Additionally, a questionnaire is used to interview patients and family members, in order to collect demographic information, as well as the means of exposure.

Due to China's open organ transplant policy, an additional vector for the transmission of rabies is via donated organs. There has been 1 reported case of rabies transmission through organ donation in 2015, where a previously healthy 2-year-old patient was checked in to a hospital with unspecified symptoms. Rabies virus antibody tests were performed on serum samples and yielded negative results, which allowed the body to be used for donations despite suspicions from the clinical staff. The donor's kidneys and liver were transplanted to three other patients, who eventually died due to the rabies virus.

In 2006 China introduced the "one-dog policy" in Beijing to control the problem.

Indonesia 
The island of Bali in Indonesia has been undergoing a severe outbreak of canine rabies since 2008, that has also killed about 78 humans as of late September 2010. Unlike predominantly Muslim parts of Indonesia, in Bali many dogs are kept as pets and strays are tolerated in residential areas. Efforts are under way to vaccinate pets and strays, as well as selective culling of some strays, to control the outbreak. As Bali is a popular tourist destination, visitors are advised to consider rabies vaccinations before going there, if they will be touching animals.

Israel 
Since 1948, 29 people have been reported dead from rabies in Israel. The last death was in 2003, when a 58-year-old Bedouin woman was bitten by a cat and became infected. She was not inoculated and later died.

Rabies is not endemic to Israel, but is imported from neighbouring countries. The areas of highest prevalence are along the northern region, which are close to Lebanon and Syria. Since the early 2000s, The Ministry of Agriculture and Israel Nature and National Parks Protection Authority (ILA) have dropped oral vaccines from planes in open and agricultural areas. The vaccine comes in the form of 3 by 3 cm. dumplings, made with an ingredient preferred by wild animals, and which contain a transgenic rabies virus. Cases of animal rabies dropped from 58 in 2009 to 29 in 2016.

Japan 
Rabies existed in Japan with a particular spike in the mid-1920s, but a dog vaccination campaign and increased stray dog control reduced cases. The Rabies Control Act was enacted in 1950, and the last human and animal cases were reported in 1954 and 1957, and Japan is believed to have been rabies-free since 1957.

There have been four imported cases since then, a college student who died in 1970, two elderly men who had traveled to the Philippines and been bitten there by rabid dogs, and then died after returning to Japan, and a man in his 30s who also was bitten by a rabid dog in the Philippines and died in 2020.

Africa 

Approximately 24,000 people die from rabies annually in Africa, which accounts for almost half the total rabies deaths worldwide each year.

South Africa 
In South Africa, about a dozen cases of human rabies are confirmed every year and it is particularly widespread in the north-eastern regions of the Eastern Cape, the eastern and south-eastern areas of Mpumalanga, northern Limpopo and KwaZulu-Natal. Dogs are the main vector (especially in the east of the country) for the disease but also wildlife, including the bat-eared fox, yellow mongoose and black-backed jackal. The death rate of 13 per annum over the decade 2001–2010  is a rate of approximately 0.26 per million population. This is approximately 30 times the rate in the United States but 1/90 of the African average. The number of cases per province over the last decade is as follows:

North America

United States

The United States as with other developed countries have seen a dramatic decrease in the number of human infections and deaths due to the rabies virus. According to the Centers for Disease Control and Prevention (CDC) the stark reduction in the number of rabies cases is attributable to the elimination of canine rabies through vaccination, the vaccination of wildlife, education about the virus, and timely administration of post exposure prophylaxis. Currently, in the U.S. only one to three cases of rabies are reported annually. Since 2008 there have been 23 cases of human rabies infection, eight of which were due to exposures outside of the U.S.  Human exposures to the virus is dependent on the prevalence of the virus in animals, thus investigations into the incidence and distribution of animal populations is vital. A breakdown of the results obtained from animal surveillance in the U.S. for 2015 revealed that wild animals accounted for 92.4% and domestic animals accounted for 7.6% of  all reported cases. In wild animals, bats were the most frequently reported rabid species (30.9% of cases during 2015), followed by raccoons (29.4%), skunks (24.8%), and foxes (5.9%).

Southern United States 
Rabies was once rare in the United States outside the Southern states, but raccoons in the mid-Atlantic and northeast United States have had a rabies epidemic since the 1970s, that is now moving westwards into Ohio. Most westward expansion has been prevented via the action of Oral Rabies Vaccination (ORV) programs.
 The particular variant of the virus has been identified in the southeastern United States raccoon population since the 1950s, and is believed to have traveled to the northeast as the result of infected raccoons being among those caught and transported from the southeast to the northeast by human hunters attempting to replenish the declining northeast raccoon population. As a result, urban residents of these areas have become more wary of the large but normally unseen urban raccoon population.  Whether as a result of increased vigilance or only the common human avoidance reaction to any other animal not normally seen, such as a raccoon, there has only been one documented human rabies case as a result of this variant. This does not include, however, the greatly increasing rate of prophylactic rabies treatments in cases of possible exposure, which numbered fewer than one hundred humans annually in the state of New York before 1990, for instance, but rose to approximately ten thousand annually between 1990 and 1995. At approximately $1,500 per course of treatment, this represents a considerable public health expenditure. Raccoons do constitute approximately 50% of the approximately eight thousand documented non-human rabies cases in the United States. Domestic animals constitute only 8% of rabies cases, but are increasing at a rapid rate.

Midwestern United States 

In the midwestern United States, skunks are the primary carriers of rabies, composing 134 of the 237 documented non-human cases in 1996. The most widely distributed reservoir of rabies in the United States, however, and the source of most human cases in the U.S., are bats. Nineteen of the twenty-two human rabies cases documented in the United States between 1980 and 1997 have been identified genetically as bat rabies. In many cases, victims are not even aware of having been bitten by a bat, assuming that a small puncture wound found after the fact was the bite of an insect or spider; in some cases, no wound at all can be found, leading to the hypothesis that in some cases the virus can be contracted via inhaling airborne aerosols from the vicinity of bats. For instance, the Centers for Disease Control and Prevention (CDC) warned on May 9, 1997, that a woman who died in October 1996 in Cumberland County, Kentucky and a man who died in December 1996 in Missoula County, Montana were both infected with a rabies strain found in silver-haired bats; although bats were found living in the chimney of the woman's home and near the man's workplace, neither victim could remember having had any contact with them. Similar reports among spelunkers led to experimental demonstration in animals. This inability to recognize a potential infection, in contrast to a bite from a dog or raccoon, leads to a lack of proper prophylactic treatment, and is the cause of the high mortality rate for transmission from bats.

On September 7, 2007, rabies expert Dr. Charles Rupprecht of Atlanta-based U.S. Centers for Disease Control and Prevention said that canine rabies had disappeared from the United States. Rupprecht emphasized that the disappearance of the canine-specific strain of rabies virus in the US does not eliminate the need for dog rabies vaccination as dogs can still become infected from exposure to wildlife.

Southwestern United States 
The primary terrestrial reservoirs for the Southwest states are skunks and foxes, with bats being identified as another important species for virus persistence in the environment. In Colorado the growing population pressures indicated by the increase in the number of residents by 9.2% between 2010 and 2016 has led to an elevated risk of rabies to the public. Additionally, according to Colorado Parks and Wildlife, reported cases, as well as the geographical distribution, in skunks, raccoons, and bats have increased; thereby further enhancing the likelihood of exposure. Together these increased risk factors have been documented  in the state by the Colorado Department of Public Health and Environment, which reported 141 positive animals; 95 of these reported animal cases were suspected to have exposed 180 domestic pets, 193 livestock animals, and 59 people. In New Mexico the same trend of increased prevalence in wildlife has been observed with a reported 57% increase in the number of rabid bats. As of 2017, there have been 11 confirmed cases of rabies in New Mexico: 5 bats, 2 skunks, 2 bobcats, and 2 foxes. Conversely to these two states, Arizona in 2015 saw a drop in the number of  confirmed rabies cases with a 21.3% decrease in reported skunk and fox rabies virus variants. Furthermore, during that same time frame in Arizona 53.3% of all reported positive rabies cases were bats and 40% were identified as skunks.  Similarly, in 2015, Utah reported 22 positive cases of rabid bats. For the year of 2016 Utah identified 20 cases of rabies, all in bat species.

Canada 
Rabies is extremely rare in Canada, since 1924 only 25 people have died of rabies, however rabies is endemic in Canadian wildlife.  there were only four cases of rabies in Canada since 2000, three of which were exposed to the virus through a bat in Canada.
The province of Ontario continues aerial drops of baits containing rabies vaccines, which reduced the incidence of rabies by 99% since the 1990s but continues to fight a 2015 outbreak of rabies in wild racoons imported from the USA.

Europe 

Several countries in Europe have been designated rabies-free jurisdictions: Austria, the United Kingdom, Ireland, Belgium, the Netherlands, Luxembourg, France, and Switzerland, Portugal, Italy, Spain, Greece, Malta, Germany, Denmark, Norway, Sweden, Finland, Latvia, Estonia, the Czech Republic, Iceland, and the Republic of Cyprus.

Spain 
The first case of rabies since 1978 was confirmed in the city of Toledo, Central Spain, on 5 June 2013. The dog had been imported from Morocco. No human fatalities have been reported, although adults and children were reported to have been bitten by the animal. There was another case in 2019, although the victim was infected in Morocco, after being bitten by a cat.

Germany 
Nine deaths from rabies were reported in Germany between 1981 and 2005. Two were caused by animal bites within Germany (one fox, one dog), and four were acquired abroad. In the remaining three cases, the source was an transplant from an infected donor who had died of heart failure prior to developing rabies symptoms. On 28 September 2008, the World Organisation for Animal Health declared Germany as free of rabies.

Ireland 
In 1897 the Disease of Animals Act included provisions to prevent the spread of rabies throughout Ireland.  There have been no indigenous cases reported since 1903.  In 2009, four people in Dublin received rabies vaccination therapy after being bitten by an imported kitten, although subsequent examination of the kitten yielded a negative result for rabies.

United Kingdom 
The UK was declared rabies free in 1902 but there were further outbreaks after 1918 when servicemen returning from war smuggled rabid dogs back to Britain from France and Belgium.  The disease was subsequently re-eradicated and Britain was declared rabies-free in 1922 after the introduction of compulsory quarantine for dogs.

Since 1902, there have been 26 deaths in the UK from rabies (excluding the European bat lyssavirus 2 case discussed below). A case in 1902 occurred shortly before the eradication of rabies from the UK, and no details were recorded for a case in 1919. All other cases of rabies caused by rabies virus acquired the infection while abroad. Sixteen cases (62%) involved infections acquired in India, Pakistan or Bangladesh, with the remainder of infections originating in Africa and Southeast Asia.

Since 2000, four deaths from rabies have occurred; none of these cases had received any post-exposure prophylactic treatment. In 2001, there were two deaths from infections acquired in Nigeria and the Philippines. One death occurred in 2005 from an infection acquired by a dog bite in Goa (western India). A woman died on 6 January 2009 in Belfast, Northern Ireland. She is believed to have been infected in South Africa, probably from being scratched by a dog. Prior to this, the last reported human case of the disease in Northern Ireland was in 1938. The most recent case was a woman who died on 28 May 2012 in London after being bitten by a dog in South Asia.

A rabies-like lyssavirus, called European bat lyssavirus 2, was identified in bats in 2003. In 2002, there was a fatal case in a bat handler involving infection with European bat lyssavirus 2; infection was probably acquired from a bite from a bat in Scotland.

Benelux 
The Netherlands has been designated rabies-free since 1923, Belgium since 2008. Isolated cases of rabies involving illegally smuggled pets from Africa, as well as infected animals crossing the German and French borders, do occur.

Norway 
The death of a woman on 6 May 2019 from the rabies virus was reported to be the first in Norway for almost 200 years. She contracted the virus while on holiday with friends in the Philippines, and after being bitten by a stray puppy they had rescued.

Switzerland 
A rabies epidemic spread by red foxes reached Switzerland in 1967. After multiple solutions were tried; baiting foxes with chicken heads laced with vaccine proved to be the most successful. Switzerland has been rabies free since the 1990s.

Oceania

Australia 
Australia is free of rabies. There have been two confirmed human deaths from the disease, in 1987 and 1990. Both were contracted overseas. However, the closely related Australian bat lyssavirus (ABLV) has caused three deaths since its discovery in 1996; the most recent of these was in 2013, when an 8-year-old Queensland boy was scratched on the wrist by an infected bat, developing ABLV and dying 2 months afterwards. There is also a report of an 1867 case. Public health officials have expressed concern that the arrival of rabies in Australia is likely, given its widespread presence in nearby Indonesia.

Rabies-free jurisdictions 

Many countries and territories have been declared to be free of rabies. The Centers for Disease Control and Prevention published the following list on 2021 based on countries and territories that are free of rabies.

Africa: Canary Islands, Cape Verde, Mayotte, Madeira Islands, Melilla, Réunion, Saint Helena
Americas: Falkland Islands, Galápagos Islands, South Georgia and the South Sandwich Islands
Asia and the Middle East: Bahrain, British Indian Ocean Territory, Cyprus, Hong Kong, Japan, Macau SAR, Maldives, Singapore
Europe: Andorra, Austria, Azores, Belgium, Croatia, Czech Republic, Denmark, Estonia, Faroe Islands, Finland, France, Germany, Gibraltar, Greece, Iceland, Ireland, Italy, Latvia, Liechtenstein, Luxembourg, Malta, Monaco, Netherlands, Norway (except Svalbard), Portugal, San Marino, Slovakia, Slovenia, Spain, Sweden, Switzerland, United Kingdom
Oceania: Easter Island, American Samoa, Australia, Christmas Island, Cocos (Keeling) Islands, Cook Islands, Fiji, French Polynesia, Guam, Kiribati, Marshall Islands, Micronesia, Nauru, New Caledonia, New Zealand, Niue, Norfolk Island, Northern Mariana Islands, Palau, Pitcairn Islands, Samoa, Solomon Islands, Tokelau, Tonga, Tuvalu, Vanuatu, Wake Island
Antarctica: Antarctica

New Zealand and Australia have never had rabies. However, in Australia, the closely related Australian bat lyssavirus occurs normally in both insectivorous and fruit-eating bats (flying foxes) from most mainland states. Scientists believe it is present in bat populations throughout the range of flying foxes in Australia.  Rabies has also never been reported in Cook Islands, Jersey in the Channel Islands, mainland Norway, Saint Vincent and the Grenadines and Vanuatu.

References 

Rabies
Infectious diseases
Infectious diseases with eradication efforts